Joan V. Hartley is an American politician. A Democrat, she has been a state senator from Connecticut since 2001.

A resident of Middlebury, she represents a large part of Waterbury, the northern part of Naugatuck and the northeastern part Middlebury. Hartley was born in Waterbury and graduated from Elms College and received a M.A. from Trinity College. Prior to being elected to the Senate, Hartley served as a Connecticut state representative representing the 73rd District from 1984 to 2000.

Hartley is generally considered one of the most conservative members of the Democratic caucus. She voted against redefining marriage as the legal union of two persons, guaranteeing equal protection under the law for same-sex couples. In 2011, Hartley and Paul Doyle were the only two Democrats to vote against transgender rights legislation.

In December 2008, Hartley was removed as the Chairwoman of the Higher Education Committee.

In 2008, Hartley was one of three Democrats who supported Rell's proposal for a Three Strikes Law against career violent criminals. In 2009, Hartley was the only Democrat in the State Senate that did not vote to override Rell's veto of the Healthcare Partnership bill, thereby preventing the bill from becoming law.

References

External links
Official website

Democratic Party Connecticut state senators
Democratic Party members of the Connecticut House of Representatives
Women state legislators in Connecticut
Living people
Trinity College (Connecticut) alumni
21st-century American politicians
21st-century American women politicians
Politicians from Waterbury, Connecticut
Year of birth missing (living people)
Elms College alumni